The Sandwich Range is located in the White Mountains of New Hampshire in the United States, north of the Lakes Region and south of the Kancamagus Highway. Although the range is not outstanding for its elevation, it is very rugged and has excellent views of the surrounding lakes, mountains, and forests.

The Kancamagus Highway runs along the north side of the mountains, from Conway to North Woodstock.

The east part of the range drains by various streams into the Saco River and thence into the Atlantic Ocean at Saco, Maine. The west part drains into the East Branch Pemigewasset River and Mad River, thence into the Pemigewasset, Merrimack and into the sea at Newburyport, Massachusetts.

The range shares its name with the town of Sandwich, situated at the range's western end.  To the south are the Ossipee Mountains, and the ancient volcanic ring dike of the Mt. Shaw massif.

Summits 
The range's summits include, among others:
 Mount Chocorua 
 Mount Kancamagus 
 Mount Passaconaway  *
 Mount Paugus 
 Mount Tripyramid    *
 Mount Whiteface  *
 Mount Wonalancet 
 Sandwich Mountain 
 The Sleepers 

The summits marked with an asterisk (*) are included on the Appalachian Mountain Club's peak-bagging list of "Four-thousand footers" in New Hampshire.

Wilderness
The Sandwich Range Wilderness was established in 1984 to protect the rugged southeastern portion of the White Mountains as part of the National Wilderness Preservation System. The  wilderness area is all within the White Mountain National Forest and managed by the U.S. Forest Service. The wilderness area covers (from west to east) Sandwich Mountain, Mount Tripyramid, The Sleepers, Mount Whiteface, Mount Passaconaway, and Mount Paugus. Mount Kancamagus falls outside the wilderness area to the west, and Mount Chocorua is outside it to the east.

See also
 List of mountains in New Hampshire
 Mount Shaw
 White Mountain National Forest

References

External links 
PeakBagger.com: Sandwich Range
 Sandwich Range area on Topozone
Sandwich Range Wilderness - White Mountain National Forest

Mountain ranges of New Hampshire
White Mountains (New Hampshire)
White Mountain National Forest
Landforms of Carroll County, New Hampshire
Landforms of Grafton County, New Hampshire